Günther Hasler (born 2 May 1951) is a Liechtenstein middle-distance runner. He competed in the men's 800 metres at the 1976 Summer Olympics.

International competitions

References

External links
 

1951 births
Living people
Athletes (track and field) at the 1976 Summer Olympics
Liechtenstein male middle-distance runners
Olympic athletes of Liechtenstein
Place of birth missing (living people)